The 2006–07 Alaska Aces season was the 21st season of the franchise in the Philippine Basketball Association (PBA).

Key dates
August 20: The 2006 PBA Draft took place in Fort Bonifacio, Taguig.

Draft picks

Award
Willie Miller won his second Most Valuable Player (MVP) award.

Roster

Philippine Cup

Game log

|- bgcolor="#edbebf" 
| 1
| September 28*
| Red Bull
| 93–99
|  Miller (23)
| 
| 
| Guam
| 0–1
|- bgcolor="#bbffbb" 
| 2
| October 4
| Coca Cola
| 99–84
|  Miller (26)
| 
| 
| Araneta Coliseum
| 1–1
|- bgcolor="#edbebf" 
| 3
| October 8
| Talk 'N Text
| 93–97
| Cortez (24)
| 
| 
| Araneta Coliseum
| 1–2
|- bgcolor="#edbebf" 
| 4
| October 14
| Sta.Lucia
| 92–98
| Miller (21)
| 
| 
| The Arena in San Juan
| 1–3
|- bgcolor="#edbebf"
| 5
| October 20
| San Miguel
| 71–81
| Miller (30)
| 
| 
| Ynares Center
| 1–4
|- bgcolor="#edbebf"
| 6
| October 27
| Purefoods
| 78–82
| Belasco (18)
| 
| 
| Araneta Coliseum
| 1–5
|- bgcolor="#edbebf" 
| 7
| October 29
| Brgy.Ginebra
| 91–98
| Miller (18)
| 
| 
| Araneta Coliseum
| 1–6

|- bgcolor="#bbffbb" 
| 8
| November 5
| Air21
| 122–100
| Cariaso (24)
| 
| 
| Araneta Coliseum
| 2–6
|- bgcolor="#edbebf" 
| 9
| November 10
| Sta.Lucia
| 98–101
| Belasco (20)
| 
| 
| Araneta Coliseum
| 2–7
|- bgcolor="#bbffbb" 
| 10
| November 17
| Welcoat
| 97–91 OT
| Belasco (23)
| 
| 
| Araneta Coliseum
| 3–7
|- bgcolor="#bbffbb" 
| 11
| November 24
| Talk 'N Text
| 
| 
| 
| 
| Cuneta Astrodome
| 4–7
|- bgcolor="#bbffbb" 
| 12
| November 26
| Red Bull
| 105–94
| Dela Cruz (18)
| 
| 
| Araneta Coliseum
| 5–7

|- bgcolor="#edbebf" 
| 13
| December 2
| San Miguel
| 99–103
| Miller, Belasco (20)
| 
| 
| General Santos
| 5–8
|- bgcolor="#edbebf" 
| 14
| December 6
| Coca Cola
| 81–85
| Miller (18)
| 
| 
| Araneta Coliseum
| 5–9
|- bgcolor="#edbebf" 
| 15
| December 9
| Brgy.Ginebra
| 101–108
| Miller (23)
| 
| 
| Lucena City
| 5–10
|- bgcolor="#bbffbb" 
| 16
| December 15
| Air21
| 100–98
| 
| 
| 
| Ynares Center
| 6–10
|- bgcolor="#bbffbb" 
| 17
| December 20
| Welcoat
| 96–90
| Miller (24)
| 
| 
| Araneta Coliseum
| 7–10
|- bgcolor="#bbffbb" 
| 18
| December 22
| Purefoods
| 96–92 OT
| Miller (25)
| 
| 
| Araneta Coliseum
| 8–10

Fiesta Conference

Game log

|- bgcolor="#bbffbb"
| 1
| March 7
| Talk 'N Text
| 98–94
| Miller (27)
| 
| 
| Araneta Coliseum
| 1–0
|- bgcolor="#bbffbb"
| 2
| March 11
| Brgy.Ginebra
| 100–98
| Ellis (27)
| Ellis (16)
| 
| Araneta Coliseum
| 2–0
|- bgcolor="#edbebf"
| 3
| March 15
| Red Bull
| 113–124 OT
| Ellis (27)
| 
| 
| Olivarez Gym
| 2–1
|- bgcolor="#bbffbb"
| 4
| March 21
| Welcoat
| 99–78
| Ellis (18)
| 
| 
| Araneta Coliseum
| 3–1
|- bgcolor="#bbffbb"
| 5
| March 25
| Coca Cola
| 106–100
| Miller (19)
| 
| 
| Araneta Coliseum
| 4–1
|- bgcolor="#bbffbb"
| 6
| March 31
| Purefoods
| 94–80
| 
| 
| 
| Subic Gym, Subic
| 5–1

|- bgcolor="#edbebf"
| 7
| April 4
| Air21
| 104–116
| Ellis (38)
| 
| 
| Araneta Coliseum
| 5–2
|- bgcolor="#bbffbb"
| 8
| April 11
| San Miguel
| 94–84
| Miller (25)
| 
| 
| Araneta Coliseum
| 6–2
|- bgcolor="#bbffbb"
| 9
| April 15
| Sta.Lucia
| 103–88
| Miller (21) Ellis (21)
| 
| 
| Araneta Coliseum
| 7–2
|-bgcolor="#edbebf"
| 10
| April 20
| Talk 'N Text
| 
| 
| 
| 
| Araneta Coliseum
| 7–3
|-bgcolor="#edbebf"
| 11
| April 24
| San Miguel
| 96–100
| 
| 
| 
| Cuneta Astrodome
| 7–4

|-bgcolor="#bbffbb"
| 12
| May 6
| Welcoat
| 74–66
| Thoss (15)
| 
| 
| Araneta Coliseum
| 8–4
|-bgcolor="#bbffbb"
| 13
| May 11
| Brgy.Ginebra
| 97–91
| Miller (22) 
| 
| 
| Ynares Center
| 9–4
|- bgcolor="#edbebf"
| 14
| May 13
| Coca Cola
| 90–94
| Ellis (23)
| 
| 
| Araneta Coliseum
| 9–5
|-bgcolor="#bbffbb"
| 15
| May 18
| Purefoods
| 104–92
| Ellis (29)
| 
| 
| Araneta Coliseum
| 10–5
|- bgcolor="#bbffbb"
| 16
| May 23
| Air21
| 117–107
| Miller (25) 
| 
| 
| Ynares Center
| 11–5
|- bgcolor="#edbebf"
| 17
| May 26
| Red Bull
| 103–113
| Miller (23) 
| 
| 
| Bacolod
| 11–6

|- bgcolor="#bbffbb"
| 18
| June 1
| Sta.Lucia
| 
| 
| 
| 
| Ynares Center
| 12–6

References

Alaska Aces (PBA) seasons
Alaska